is a Japanese professional  basketball player who plays for Toyota Antelopes of the Women's Japan Basketball League .  She also plays for Japan women's national 3x3 team. She brought the U23 national team to a gold medal at the FIBA 3x3 Under-23 World Cup in Lanzhou. This was the Japan's very first world title in basketball.

References

External links

1997 births
Living people
Basketball players at the 2018 Asian Games
Sportspeople from Nagasaki Prefecture
Asian Games medalists in basketball
Asian Games bronze medalists for Japan
Medalists at the 2018 Asian Games